Devron Kyber García Ducker (born 17 February 1996) is a Honduran professional footballer who plays for Vida..

Club career
After three seasons with C.D. Victoria in Honduras, García moved to Major League Soccer side Orlando City on January 27, 2016. He was loaned to Orlando's United Soccer League affiliate club Orlando City B on April 15, 2016.

On 10 March 2017, García signed on loan with Real España.

References

External links

1996 births
Living people
Honduran footballers
Association football midfielders
C.D. Victoria players
Orlando City SC players
Orlando City B players
Liga Nacional de Fútbol Profesional de Honduras players
USL Championship players
2015 CONCACAF U-20 Championship players
People from Roatán
Honduran expatriate footballers
Expatriate soccer players in the United States
Honduran expatriate sportspeople in the United States
Honduras under-20 international footballers